Maksim Shvyatsow (born 2 April 1998) is a Belarusian professional footballer who plays for Dinamo Minsk and the Belarus national team.

References

External links 
 
 

1998 births
Living people
Belarusian footballers
Belarus international footballers
Association football defenders
FC Dinamo Minsk players